Peter Mennin (born Mennini) (May 17, 1923 in Erie, Pennsylvania – June 17, 1983 in New York City) was a prominent American composer, teacher and administrator. In 1958, he was named Director of the Peabody Conservatory in Baltimore, and in 1962 became President of the Juilliard School, a position he held until his death in 1983. Under his leadership, Juilliard moved from Claremont Avenue to its present location at Lincoln Center. Mennin is responsible for the addition of drama and dance departments at Juilliard. He also started the Master Class Program, and brought many artists to teach including Maria Callas, Pierre Fournier and others.

Biography
Born Peter Mennini in Erie, Pennsylvania on May 17, 1923, Mennin was the son of Italian immigrants Amalia (née Benacci) and Attilio Mennini and the younger brother of composer Louis Mennini. Musically gifted from an early age, he started his first orchestral piece at eleven and completed his first symphony (out of nine he would eventually write) before his 19th birthday. He began his studies at the Oberlin Conservatory with Norman Lockwood when he was 16, but left in 1941 to join the U. S. Army Air Force. He continued his studies with Howard Hanson at the Eastman School of Music, where he received his BA and master's degree in 1945. His Third Symphony, finished the day he turned 23 and initially written for his PhD requirements at Eastman, immediately catapulted him to music prominence. The work was performed by the New York Philharmonic the following year, and it led Mennin’s appointment to the composition faculty of The Juilliard School. It was a runner up for the Pulitzer Prize in 1950. Dr. Mennin led the first artistic exchange with the Soviet Union in 1958, where he spent six weeks. He received two Guggenheim fellowships for Music composition, in 1949 and 1957.

His String Quartet No 2 was premiered by the Juilliard String Quartet in New York City on 24 February 1952, and was subsequently recorded on Columbia Records.

Mennin  wrote nine symphonies, several concertos, and numerous works for wind band, chorus, and other ensembles. His style became more chromatic and astringent with time, but was always essentially tonal, relying heavily on polyphony.

His work received renewed attention in the CD era; all of his symphonies have been recorded, with the exception of the first two symphonies, which have been withdrawn.

Juilliard awards an annual Peter Mennin prize for Outstanding Achievement and Leadership in Music.

His notable students include Van Cliburn, Jacob Druckman, Richard Danielpour, Karl Korte, Charles L. Bestor, Jack Behrens, and Claire Polin.

Principal works

Symphonies
Symphony No. 1 (1942) withdrawn
Symphony No. 2 (1944) (Gershwin Memorial Award, 1945) withdrawn
Symphony No. 3 (completed May 17, 1946, his doctoral dissertation. Premiered February 1947 by the New York Philharmonic, conducted by Walter Hendl.)
Symphony No. 4 The Cycle (1947–8) (Chorus & orchestra)
Symphony No. 5 (1950) (commissioned and premiered by the Dallas Symphony and Walter Hendl)
Symphony No. 6 (1953)
Symphony No. 7 Variation-symphony (1963, pub. 1967)
Symphony No. 8 (1973)
Symphony No. 9 (1981)

Other orchestral works
Folk Overture (1945)
Fantasia for String Orchestra (1947)
Concertato Moby Dick (1952)
Cello concerto (1956)
Piano concerto (1958) (Premiered by Eunice Podis, piano, with George Szell conducting the Cleveland Orchestra)
Canto (1962; pub. 1965)
Flute concerto (1983)
Note: A number of sources have listed a violin concerto among Mennin's works, leading to many questions on the internet. In fact, Mennin began to write a violin concerto for Roman Totenberg during the early 1950s. He completed a slow movement in short score, but nothing beyond that.

Concert Band works
Canzona for band (1951)

Piano
Five pieces (1949)
Piano sonata (1963)

Choral works
Four Chinese Poems (1948)
In the Quiet Night
Crossing the Han River
A Song of the Palace
The Gold Threaded Robe
Christmas Story (1949)
Cantata di Virtute, "The Pied Piper of Hamelin" (1969)
Reflections of Emily (1978)

Chamber works
String quartet #1
String quartet #2 (1951)
Sonata concertante, for violin and piano (1956)

References

Walter Simmons: Voices of Stone and Steel: The Music of William Schuman, Vincent Persichetti, and Peter Mennin. Lanham, MD. Scarecrow Press, 2011  .

External links
Art of the States: Peter Mennin
Peter Mennin's page at Carl Fischer
Peter Mennin website

1923 births
1983 deaths
20th-century classical composers
20th-century American composers
20th-century American male musicians
American classical composers
American male classical composers
Classical musicians from Pennsylvania
Musicians from Erie, Pennsylvania
Juilliard School faculty
Presidents of the Juilliard School
Peabody Institute faculty
Pupils of Howard Hanson
Pupils of Bernard Rogers
Oberlin Conservatory of Music alumni
United States Army Air Forces personnel of World War II
20th-century American academics